Weare is a surname, and may refer to:

 Frank Weare (1896–1971), British World War I flying ace
 Jack Weare (1912–1994), Welsh footballer
 Joseph Weare (1737–1774), American Indian fighter
 Kate Weare, American choreographer
 Katherine Weare (born 1950), Professor of Education at the University of Southampton, England
 Len Weare, Welsh professional footballer
 Meshech Weare (1713–1786), American farmer
 Neil Weare (born 1980), Guam middle-distance runner
 Ross Weare (born 1977), footballer
 Tony Weare (1912–1994), English comics artist
 William Weare, victim in the Radlett murder